Sporadic E (abbreviated E or SpE) is an unusual form of radio propagation using a low level of the Earth's ionosphere that normally does not refract radio waves.

Sporadic E propagation reflects signals off relatively small "clouds" in the lower E region located at altitudes of about 95~150 km (50~100 miles). These "clouds" are composed of ionized metals ablated off micrometeoroids. Whereas E layer propagation depends on the temporary abundance of metallic meteor dust, the more conventional forms of skywave propagation in the ionosphere's higher F region refract off layers of electrons knocked off of gasses by intense UV light, which are renewed on a fairly regular daily cycle. In both cases, the ionized material, when present, refracts (or "bends") radio signals back toward the Earth's surface creating a "bent pipe" path for radio signals.

The E propagation often supports occasional long-distance communication during the approximately 6 weeks centered on summer solstice at very high frequencies (VHF), which under normal conditions can only propagate by line-of-sight.

Overview
As its name suggests, sporadic E is an unpredictable event that can happen at almost any time; it does, however, display strong seasonal and diurnal patterns. Sporadic E activity peaks predictably near the summer solstice in both hemispheres. In North America, the peak is most noticeable from early June, trailing off through late July and into early August. A much smaller peak occurs around the winter solstice. Activity usually begins in mid-December in the southern hemisphere, with the days immediately after Christmas being the most active period.

Communication distances of 800–2,200 km (500–1,400 miles) can occur using a single E cloud. This variability in distance depends on a number of factors, including cloud height and density. The maximum usable frequency (MUF) also varies widely, but most commonly falls in the 25–150 MHz range, which includes the FM broadcast band (87.5–108 MHz), band I VHF television (American TV channels 2–6, Russian channels 1–5, and European channels 2–C, which are no longer used in Western Europe), CB radio (27 MHz), and the amateur radio 2 meter, 4 m, 6 m, and 10 m bands. Strong events have allowed propagation at frequencies as high as 250 MHz.

No conclusive theory has yet been formulated as to the origin of sporadic E. Attempts to connect the incidence of sporadic E with the eleven-year Sunspot cycle have provided tentative correlations. There seems to be a positive correlation between sunspot maximum and E activity in Europe. Conversely, there seems to be a negative correlation between maximum sunspot activity and E activity in Australasia.

Characteristic distances
Television and FM signals received via sporadic E can be extremely strong and range in strength over a short period from just detectable to overloading. Although polarisation shift can occur, single-hop E signals tend to remain in the original transmitted polarization. Long single-hop sporadic E television signals tend to be more stable and relatively free of multipath images.

Shorter-skip signals tend to be reflected from more than one part of the sporadic E layer, resulting in multiple images and ghosting, with phase reversal at times. Picture degradation and signal-strength attenuation worsens with each subsequent sporadic E hop.

Sporadic E usually affects the lower VHF band I (TV channels 2–6, E2–E4, and R1–R5) and band II (88–108 MHz FM broadcast band). A 1945 FCC engineering study concluded that E caused interference issues 1% of the time for a station broadcasting at 42 MHz, but only 0.01% for one at 84 MHz.

When short-skip E reception occurs, i.e., under  in band I, there is a greater possibility that the ionized sporadic E cloud will be capable of reflecting a signal at a much higher frequency – i.e., a VHF band 3 channel – since a sharp reflection angle (short skip) favours low frequencies, a shallower reflection angle from the same ionized cloud will favour a higher frequency. In this case even E DVB-T reception might be possible if a MUX uses VHF band 3, preferably channel E5, especially if QPSK mode is used, due to its low signal requirements. In addition to that, band 3 signals are more affected by tropospheric propagation which may indirectly increase the actual MUF because the signals only need to be refracted to low enough elevations that they get refracted towards the ground by the troposphere.

Equatorial sporadic E
Equatorial sporadic E is a regular daytime occurrence over the equatorial regions. For stations located within ±10° of the geomagnetic equator, equatorial E-skip can be expected on most days throughout the year, peaking around midday local time.

Auroral sporadic E 
At polar latitudes, sporadic E can accompany auroras and associated disturbed magnetic conditions and is called auroral E.

Unlike equatorial or mid-latitude E, sporadic E propagation over high latitude paths is rare, and supports unexpected contacts between locations surrounding the Arctic, even during periods of low solar activity.

Occasional "bonanza" events
On 12 June 2009, sporadic E allowed some television viewers in the eastern United States to see VHF analog TV stations from other states at great distances, in places and on TV channels where local stations had already done their permanent analog shutdown on the final day of the DTV transition in the United States. This was possible because VHF has been mostly avoided by digital TV stations, leaving the analog stations the last ones on the band.

As of April 2010, it was possible for many in the U.S. to see Canadian and Mexican analog in this manner during sporadic E events; this should continue until all parts of those countries complete their own analog TV shutdowns over the succeeding few years.

In some cases it is even possible to get DTV E receptions from well over 1,000 miles (1,600 km), since even for DTV, some U.S. stations still use band 1. These signals are characterized for being either extremely clear, or extremely blocky. They are also much easier to identify. Furthermore, ATSC 3.0 could make sporadic E DTV reception easier, due to its usual modulation scheme being more resistant to multipath propagation, as well as impulse noise encountered on those frequencies.

Notable sporadic E DX reception events 

 The Medford Mail Tribune in Medford, Oregon reported on 1 June 1953, that KGNC-TV, channel 4 in Amarillo, and KFEL-TV, channel 2 from Denver had been received on the Trowbridge and Flynn Electric Company's television set at their Court Street warehouse, and with a pre-amplifier, a New York station's test pattern was reportedly picked up.

 The 4 June 1953 issue of the Brimfield News in Brimfield, Illinois reported that area residents " 'saw' Salt Lake City Monday (via television)". It reported that a local farm family witnessed interference to WHBF-TV, channel 4 of Rock Island, Illinois by KDYL-TV in Salt Lake City, which "blocked out all their favorite programs."

 On 26 June 2003, Paul Logan, in Lisnaskea, Northern Ireland, was the first DXer to receive transatlantic sporadic E at frequencies above 88 MHz. Stations received included 88.5 MHz WHCF Bangor, Maine, and 97.5 MHz WFRY Watertown, New York. David Hamilton from Cumnock in Ayrshire, Scotland, received CBTB from Baie Verte, Newfoundland and Labrador, Canada, on 97.1 MHz on this day also.

 On 15 June 2005, Danny Oglethorpe in Shreveport, Louisiana, received a KBEJ-TV test signal on channel 2, from Fredericksburg, Texas, by sporadic E, at a very short distance for this propagation mode: .

 On 26 June 2009, Paul Logan, in Lisnaskea, Northern Ireland, had transatlantic sporadic E reception on the FM band from eight US States and one Canadian Province. The most distant signal received was that of 90.7 WVAS radio in Montgomery, Alabama, at 6,456 km (4,012 miles). This reception was recorded and later confirmed by WVAS newsreader Marcus Hyles.

 On 24 November 2016, many radio listeners from Australia and New Zealand were able to listen to radio stations from other states of Australia, overlapping many radio signals. Many people complained about this, saying that many of their favorite radio stations got replaced by different radio stations from other states. Later, the ACMA confirmed that this was caused by sporadic E.

See also
TV and FM DX

References

Further reading
 
 
 
 
 
 
 
 

Ionosphere
Radio frequency propagation